The Douaumont Ossuary is a memorial containing the skeletal remains of soldiers who died on the battlefield during the Battle of Verdun in World War I. It is located in Douaumont-Vaux, France, within the Verdun battlefield, and immediately next to the Fleury-devant-Douaumont National Necropolis. It was built on the initiative of Charles Ginisty, Bishop of Verdun.

History 

During the 300 days of the Battle of Verdun (21 February 1916 – 19 December 1916) approximately 230,000 men died out of a total of 700,000 casualties (dead, wounded and missing).

Ossuary information 

The ossuary is a memorial containing the remains of both French and German soldiers who died on the Verdun battlefield. Through small outside windows, the skeletal remains of at least 130,000 unidentified combatants of both nations can be seen filling up alcoves at the lower edge of the building. On the inside of the ossuary building, the ceiling and walls are partly covered by plaques bearing names of French soldiers who died during the Battle of Verdun. A few of the names are from fighting that took place in the area during World War II, as well as for veterans of the Indochina and Algerian Wars. The families of the soldiers that are recognized here by name contributed for those individual plaques. In front of the monument, and sloping downhill, lies the largest single French military cemetery of the First World War with 16,142 graves. It was inaugurated in 1923 by Verdun veteran André Maginot, who would later approve work on the Maginot Line.

The ossuary was officially inaugurated on 7 August 1932 by French President Albert Lebrun.

Architecture 

The architects of the ossuary were Léon Azéma, Max Edrei, and Jacques Hardy. George Desvallières designed the stained glass windows. It was offered by an American benefactor, Anne Thornburn Van Buren, in 1927. At the top of the tower is a rotating red and white "lantern of the dead", which shines on the battlefields at night.

See also 
 Fort Douaumont
 Battle of the Somme
 Thiepval Memorial to the Missing of the Somme
 World War I memorials

References

External links 

 Douaumont Official Site

Battle of Verdun
Ossuaries
World War I cemeteries in France
World War I memorials in France
Cemeteries in Grand Est
Buildings and structures in Meuse (department)
Tourist attractions in Meuse (department)
National cemeteries
Art Deco architecture in France